The 1990–91 NCAA Division I men's basketball season began in November 1990 and ended with the Final Four at the Hoosier Dome in Indianapolis, Indiana on April 1, 1991. The Duke Blue Devils won their first NCAA national championship with a 72–65 victory over the Kansas Jayhawks.

Season headlines

 UNLV was the first team since the 1975–76 Indiana Hoosiers to enter the NCAA tournament unbeaten. The Rebels would reach 34-0 (and 45 straight wins dating to the previous season) before losing 79-77 in the National Semifinals to Duke.
 Duke won its first national championship in its ninth Final Four appearance (and fourth consecutive).

Major rule changes
Beginning in 1990–91, the following rules changes were implemented:

Season outlook

Pre-season polls
The top 25 from the AP Poll and Coaches Poll during the pre-season.

Regular season

Conference winners and tournaments

Statistical leaders

Conference standings

Postseason tournaments

NCAA tournament

Final Four - Hoosier Dome, Indianapolis, Indiana

National Invitation tournament

NIT Semifinals and Final

Award winners

Consensus All-American teams

Major player of the year awards
Wooden Award: Larry Johnson, UNLV
Naismith Award: Larry Johnson, UNLV
Associated Press Player of the Year: Shaquille O'Neal, LSU
 UPI Player of the Year: Shaquille O'Neal, LSU
NABC Player of the Year: Larry Johnson, UNLV
Oscar Robertson Trophy (USBWA): Larry Johnson, UNLV
Adolph Rupp Trophy: Shaquille O'Neal, LSU
Sporting News Player of the Year: Larry Johnson, UNLV

Major coach of the year awards
Associated Press Coach of the Year: Randy Ayers, Ohio State
UPI Coach of the Year: Rick Majerus, Utah
Henry Iba Award (USBWA): Randy Ayers, Ohio State
NABC Coach of the Year: Mike Krzyzewski, Duke
Naismith College Coach of the Year: Randy Ayers, Ohio State
CBS/Chevrolet Coach of the Year: Randy Ayers, Ohio State
Sporting News Coach of the Year: Rick Pitino, Kentucky

Other major awards
Frances Pomeroy Naismith Award (Best player under 6'0): Keith Jennings, East Tennessee State
Robert V. Geasey Trophy (Top player in Philadelphia Big 5): Mark Macon, Temple
NIT/Haggerty Award (Top player in New York City metro area): Malik Sealy, St. John's
USBWA National Freshman of the Year: Rodney Rogers, Wake Forest

Coaching changes 

A number of teams changed coaches during the season and after it ended.

References